Yalda Hakim (born 26 June 1983) is an Australian broadcast journalist, news presenter, and documentary maker. After her family left Afghanistan and settled in Australia in 1986, she grew up in the western Sydney suburb of Parramatta and went on to study journalism. She started her career at SBS Television, moving to BBC TV in 2012. Hakim predominantly presents on BBC World News.

Early life and education
Hakim was born on 26 June 1983 in Kabul, Afghanistan. Her family fled the country during the Soviet–Afghan War when she was six months old. The family travelled on horseback overland to Pakistan with the help of people smugglers. After two years in Pakistan, the family settled in Australia as migrants in 1986, when she was three years old.

Hakim attended Macarthur Girls High School in Parramatta, Sydney, where she played the violin and became a sports captain and prefect. She also attended Parramatta West Public School.

Hakim went on to study for a Bachelor of Arts degree in Media from 2002 to 2004 at Macquarie University, where she was also a board member of the Macquarie University Union.

In 2005, Hakim received a Diploma in Journalism at Macleay College, Sydney. She then went on to study a Bachelor of Arts in Journalism via distance education at Monash University from 2007 to 2009, in addition to a cadetship at the Special Broadcasting Service.

Career

SBS and Dateline
Hakim returned to Kabul for her first Dateline report in 2008, and from then reported from across the world for Dateline and SBS World News Australia.

She was awarded the United Nations Association of Australia Media Peace Prize for best Australian Television News Coverage in 2009, and has also been a finalist for the Walkley Young Australian Journalist of the Year Award.

Beginning in 2011, Hakim co-hosted Dateline with fellow video journalist Mark Davis, the two taking it in turns to present the programme in approximately six-week blocks, while the other was away on assignment.

BBC News
In December 2012, it was announced that Hakim would join the BBC. Hakim had been in talks with BBC executives since April 2012, after being approached at a broadcasting conference in Brisbane. Subsequent meetings took place in New York, Dubai, and Afghanistan. She first appeared on BBC World News and the BBC News Channel in March 2013.

In October 2013, she interviewed Hamid Karzai, the President of Afghanistan, for Newsnight.

Since March 2014, she has made several appearances as the presenter on Impact, ultimately becoming the programme's main presenter later that year.

Her documentaries and reports can also be seen on the BBC News Channel and on BBC Two's Newsnight. She was nominated for a Peabody Award in 2021 for her writing and reporting contribution on Afghanistan: Documenting A Crucial Year. 

On 8 September 2022, Hakim tweeted that Elizabeth II had died 3 hours and 23 minutes (3 minutes before the official time of death at 15:10) in advance of the formal announcement of her death; she later withdrew the tweet.

In February 2023, it was announced Hakim would become a chief presenter on the BBC’s new news channel for both UK and international viewers due to launch in April.

Yalda Hakim Foundation
The Yalda Hakim Foundation (YHF) was established in 2018 to support the education of exceptionally talented young women from Afghanistan, through scholarships, internships, and mentoring. In 2019 it offered a full four-year scholarship program at the American University of Afghanistan. 
In 2021 the Yalda Hakim Foundation partnered with Oriel College at Oxford University to provide a scholarship for a young Afghan woman, offering a fully-funded one-year masters degree course.

References

External links

BBC Profile

1983 births
Living people
Afghan emigrants to Australia
Afghan emigrants to Pakistan
Australian television journalists
Australian television presenters
Australian women television presenters
Australian women journalists
Special Broadcasting Service
BBC newsreaders and journalists
BBC World News
Australian expatriates in the United Kingdom
Afghan expatriates in Pakistan
Naturalised citizens of Australia